Tin Myint Aung is a Burmese football manager. He is currently managing the Myanmar women's national football team. .

His playing career established in the Yangon University. In 1987, he was a key player of the Finance & Revenue Football Team, the most successful football club in Myanmar football history. He moved to Malaysia along with Myo Hlaing Win and Than Toe Aung in 1989 and he came back in 1991. He retired in 2000.

References 

1967 births
Living people
Burmese football managers
Myanmar national football team managers
Footballers at the 1994 Asian Games
Burmese footballers
Asian Games competitors for Myanmar
Association footballers not categorized by position
Women's national association football team managers